Korea's Got Talent is a South Korean reality television show that was first broadcast in 2012 on tvN. The show is based on the Got Talent series format, originating with Britain's Got Talent. This is the show's second and final season. The judges were Kolleen Park, Jang Jin and Jang Hang-jun, and a guest judge was Kim Gura.

Semi-finals and wildcard

Semi-final 1

Semi-final 2

Semi-final 3

Wildcard

Grand final

Extrernal links 
 

Korea's Got Talent
2012 South Korean television seasons